Leopold Siemens (17 May 1889 - 7 December 1979) was a Vice admiral in the Kriegsmarine during World War II.  He served as captain of the cruiser Karlsruhe in the mid 1930s and held the short lived position of Deputy fleet commander of the German Navy (2. Admiral der Flotte) in 1941.

Early life and career

Siemens was born 1889 in Berlin and joined the Imperial German Navy in 1911 as a Midshipman.  During World War I he held junior officer billets, including a tour onboard the cruiser Victoria Louise.  He continued his career after the surrender of Germany, serving in the Reichsmarine, and when the Nazi Party came to power in Germany, and established the Nazi state, Siemens was a lieutenant commander serving as a mid-level staff officer.

On September 23, 1935, as a naval commander, Siemens was given command of the cruiser Karlsruhe.  He was promoted to captain the following year and held this command until September of 1937.

Second World War

Siemens was a senior captain upon the outbreak of World War II and was promoted to flag rank in January 1940.  A year later, he was selected to serve under Günther Lütjens as deputy fleet commander of the German Navy.  The position did not entail at-sea command, but was an administrative posting overseeing the type commanders within the organization of the Kriegsmarine.  After Lütjens was killed onboard the battleship Bismarck, Siemens continued his post briefly under Otto Schniewind before the position was disbanded in June 1941.

Promoted to Vizeadmiral in 1942, Siemens was appointed as naval commander of the Norwegian coast in 1943.  The following year he was posted to the staff of the naval region Baltic Sea and was released to inactive duty in January 1945.

Post war

Leopold Siemens died 7 December 1979 in Cologne, Germany.

Summary of Career

Dates of rank

 Fähnrich zur See: 15 April 1911
 Leutnant zur See: 27 September 1913
 Oberleutnant zur See: 22 March 1916
 Kapitänleutnant: 1 January 1921
 Korvettenkapitän: 1 March 1929
 Fregattenkapitän: 1 October 1934
 Kapitän zur See: 1 April 1936
 Konteradmiral: 1 January 1940
 Vizeadmiral: 1 April 1942

References

1889 births
1979 deaths
Vice admirals of the Kriegsmarine
Imperial German Navy personnel of World War I
Reichsmarine personnel